Bullis may refer to:

Bullis (surname)
Bullis School, school in Potomac, Maryland, United States
Bullis (butterfly), butterfly genus
Camp Bullis, U.S. Army training camp in Bexar County, Texas

See also
Bulis, a genus of beetle
Bulli (disambiguation)
 Bullace